Great Britain (the name which the United Kingdom of Great Britain and Northern Ireland competes under at Olympic and Paralympic level) sent a delegation of 166 athletes to the 2004 Summer Paralympics, covering 15 sports. The ParalympicsGB team entered the opening ceremony behind the Union Flag carried by Noel Thatcher.

Medallists

The following British competitors won medals at the Games. In the 'by discipline' sections below, medallists' names are in bold.

| width="95%" align="left" valign="top" |

| width="22%" align="left" valign="top" |

Medals by sport

Medals by date

Medals by gender

Multiple medallists

The following competitors won multiple medals at the 2004 Paralympic Games.

Competitors and results by event

Archery

Men

Women

Legend:

Athletics

Men—Track

Men-field

Women—Track

Women-field

Jenny Ridley - withdrew after being reclassified from T52 to T53

Boccia

Cycling

Road cycling

Track cycling 

Key
AT = actual time
FT = factor time
OVL = Win by overtaking
Q = Qualified for next round
ql = Qualified for lower round
WR = World record

Equestrian

Individual events

Team

Reserves
Ricky Balshaw (grade II)

Judo

Powerlifting

Sailing

Shooting

Swimming

Men

Women

Table tennis

Men

Women

Wheelchair basketball

Men
The men's team won a bronze medal.

Players
Ade Adepitan
Andy Blake
Matt Byrne
Terry Bywater
Pete Finbow
Kevin Hayes
Fred Howley
Stuart Jellows
Simon Munn
Jon Pollock
Colin Price
Sinclair Thomas

Results

Women
The women's team didn't win any medals: they were 8th out of 8.

Players
Sarah Burrett
Jenny Dalgleish
Jill Fox
Sonia Howe
Caroline MacLean
Caroline Matthews
Kristina Small
Wendy Smith
Clare Strange
Helen Turner
Sally Wager
Ann Wild

Results

Wheelchair fencing

Wheelchair rugby

The rugby team didn't win any medals: they reached the bronze medal match but were lost to United States.

Players
Alan Ash
Andy Barrow
Jonny Coggan
Troye Collins
Justin Frishberg
Ross Morrison
Bob O'Shea
Steve Palmer
Jason Roberts
Paul Shaw
Tony Stackhouse
Rob Tarr

Results

Wheelchair tennis
''See also Wheelchair tennis at the 2004 Summer Paralympics.

Men

Women

Quads

Media coverage
As with the 2004 Summer Olympics, the BBC aired coverage from the games, live on the bbc.co.uk website via streaming webcasts for UK broadband users, and nightly in a 90-minute highlights programme on BBC Two, presented by Clare Balding.

See also
Great Britain at the 2004 Summer Olympics

References

Nations at the 2004 Summer Paralympics
Paralympics
2004